Zdenek Mezl (born 13 July 1948 in Prague, Czechoslovakia) is a Canadian former ski jumper who competed in the 1972 Winter Olympics.

References

1948 births
Living people
Canadian male ski jumpers
Olympic ski jumpers of Canada
Ski jumpers at the 1972 Winter Olympics
20th-century Canadian people
Sportspeople from Prague